Ranthambore National Park is a national park in Rajasthan, India, with an area of . It is bounded to the north by the Banas River and to the south by the Chambal River. It is named after the historic Ranthambore Fort, which lies within the park.

History 
It was declared one of the Project Tiger reserves in 1973 and became a national park on 1 November 1980. In 1984, the adjacent forests were declared the Sawai Man Singh Sanctuary and Keladevi Sanctuary. In 1992, the Tiger Reserve was expanded to include the adjoining Keladevi Sanctuary in the north and Sawai Mansingh Sanctuary to the south along with other forests.

Features 

Ranthambore National Park harbours dry deciduous forests and open grassy meadow. The flora of the park includes 539 species of flowering plants.

Inside the fort are three red Karauli stone temples devoted to Ganesh, Shiva and Ramlalaji. There is a Digamber Jain temple of Lord Sumatinath and Lord Sambhavanath. The temples were constructed in the 12th and 13th centuries.

Padam Talao is the largest of the many lakes in the park. A red sandstone Jogi Mahal is at the edge of the lake. A gigantic Banyan tree, considered to be India's second largest, is also near the lake.

The national park covers a total area of 392 km2, including buffer zone. The core area is about 275 km2. The tiger reserve area was about 334 km2. Today, it covers an area of 1334 km2. The elevation is about 215 to 505 meters above mean sea level. The land features dense tropical dry forest, open bushland and rocky terrain interspersed with lakes and streams. Ecoregion includes Khathiar-Gir dry deciduous forests.

Wildlife 
Ranthambore National Park harbours Bengal tiger, Indian leopard, caracal, jungle cat, rusty-spotted cat, Indian elephant, wild water buffalo, gaur, nilgai, barasingha, blackbuck, chinkara, chousingha, wild boar, chital, sambar, Indian muntjac, Indian hog deer, striped hyena, dhole, Indian wolf, Bengal fox, Indian jackal, leopard cat, Asian palm civet, Indian grey mongoose, ruddy mongoose, long-eared hedgehog, Northern palm squirrel, Indian porcupine, Indian hare, lesser bandicoot rat, honey badger, Indian flying fox, greater false vampire bat, Indian gerbil, Indian pangolin, sloth bear, southern plains gray langur, rhesus macaque, mugger crocodile. The sanctuary is home to a wide variety of trees, plants, birds and reptiles, as well as one of the largest banyan trees in India.

Tigers 

Ranthambore is known for its large tiger population. During the past few years, there has been a decline in the tiger population in Ranthambhore due to poaching and other reasons. The number of tigers was 25 in 2005 and 48 in 2013.
As of 2014, there were 62 tigers in Ranthambore National Park.

Ecosystem valuation 
Economic valuation of the tiger reserve estimated that its flow benefits are worth 8.3 billion rupees (0.56 lakh/hectare) annually. Gene-pool protection services (7.11 billion), provisioning of water to the neighbouring region (115 million) and provisioning of habitat and refugia for wildlife (182 million) were some of the important services that emanated from the tiger reserve. Other services included nutrient cycling (34 million) and sequestration of carbon (69 million).

See also 
 Arid Forest Research Institute
 Indian Council of Forestry Research and Education
 Khandar Fort
 Rajiv Gandhi Regional Museum of Natural History
 Ramgarh Vishdhari Wildlife Sanctuary

References 

Singh, V. and Shrivastava, A. 2007. Biodiversity of Ranthambhore Tiger Reserve, Rajasthan. Scientific Publishers, Jodhpur.

External links 

Khathiar-Gir dry deciduous forests
National parks in Rajasthan
Protected areas established in 1980
Tiger reserves of India
Tourist attractions in Sawai Madhopur district
1980 establishments in Rajasthan